The IV Corps is a corps of the Korean People's Army of the Democratic People's Republic of Korea. It was established after the outbreak of the Korean War in June 1950.

Rottman writes that in July 1951 it comprised the 4th and 5th Divisions, the 105th Armoured Division, and the 26th Brigade. By the ceasefire of July 1953, it comprised the 4th, 5th, and 10th Divisions.

In 2001, it was responsible for the southwestern part of North Korea. The corps is reportedly headquartered at Haeju, South Hwanghae Province.

See also

I Corps
II Corps
III Corps
V Corps
XII Corps

References

Works cited

Corps of North Korea
Corps of North Korea in the Korean War